Stealing Athena is an historical novel by Karen Essex, which chronicles the journey of the controversial Elgin Marbles or Parthenon Sculptures from their home atop the Acropolis in Athens to the present location, The British Museum.  The story is told in dual narratives from the points of view of Mary Nisbet, Countess of Elgin, who assisted her husband, British ambassador Lord Elgin, in removing the marbles, and Aspasia, mistress to Pericles, who witnessed the construction of the Parthenon.  Published by Doubleday, June 2008.

References

External links
 Author Website

2008 American novels
Fiction set in the 1800s
Fiction set in the 1810s
Doubleday (publisher) books